Ratu Rakuita Saurara Vakalalabure (born 1962) is a Fijian lawyer and former politician.  He was first elected to the House of Representatives in 1999 and following the elections after the 2000 political upheavals was a candidate of the Conservative Alliance (CAMV). He was re-elected to the House of Representatives, winning the Cakaudrove West Fijian Communal Constituency in the parliamentary election of 2001, following in the footsteps of his father, Ratu Tevita Vakalalabure, who claimed to hold the chiefly title of Vunivalu (Paramount Chief) of Natewa, in Cakaudrove Province, and who served in both houses of Parliament from the 1970s to the 1990s.  He was subsequently appointed Deputy Speaker of the House of Representatives, but on 5 August 2004, he was sentenced to six years' imprisonment for his role in the Fiji coup of 2000, however the sentence was successfully reduced on appeal.

Education and early career 
Vakalalabure studied at the University of the South Pacific for a science degree in 1981 but left in 1983 to join the military and completed six tours of duty with the Fijian Military in South Lebanon reaching the rank of captain in the regular force. He went on to complete a law degree at Bond University in Queensland and post`graduate diploma in legal practice from A.N.U Canberra, Australia. Later received his master's degree in Law [Commercial and corporate law specializing in international trade and finance] from the University of London, England.  After returning to Fiji, he served as a state prosecutor for four years under the then-Director of Public Prosecutions, Nazhat Shameem and three years as Legal advisor and Board Secretary for the Civil Aviation Authority of Fiji.  In an ironic twist, he was later to be convicted and sentenced for coup-related offences by Shameem, by then a judge.

Vakalalabure was also a reserve officer in the Fijian army, following secondment to the`civil service from the regular forces.  He was dismissed by Military commander Commodore Frank Bainimarama for insubordination, for refusing to return to barracks while the 2000 coup was in progress. The dismissal was never formalised or sanctioned by any due process as required by military law.

Unlawful oath conviction 
Vakalalabure, who was taken hostage as a member of parliament at the time of the insurrection and sworn in as a Minister, was found guilty of illegally accepting and taking an oath of office for a ministerial position in the rebel government proposed by George Speight, the chief instigator of the coup. An investigation had uncovered incriminating documents in a briefcase belonging to Vakalalabure, and he was filmed being sworn in as Minister for Justice in an emotional ceremony.  He was jailed in Korovou prison, alongside former Vice-President Ratu Jope Seniloli, and former parliamentarians Peceli Rinakama, Viliame Volavola, and politician Viliame Savu.

He was allowed out of prison on 17 May 2005 to attend the funeral of his father, who had died on 6 May.

On 25 May 2005, the High Court upheld an earlier decision of the Parliamentary Speaker, Ratu Epeli Nailatikau, to expel Vakalalabure from Parliament for nonattendance.  Vakalalabure sued, claiming that Nailatikau's refusal to grant him leave of absence from the House for more than two sessions breached British parliamentary rules, on which Fiji's are based.  Justice Filimoni Jitoko, however, struck out Vakalalabure's claim, ruling that Nailatikau's actions were constitutional and followed precedent.

Ratu Rakuita Vakalalabure was also deregistered by the Fiji Law Society and disbarred from practising.  This decision has been appealed to the Court of Appeal. The Law Society's disciplinary committee clarified that he could reapply in due course.

Sentence appealed and reduced 
Lautoka lawyer Iqbal Khan announced on 30 August 2005 that he had filed an application on behalf of Vakalalabure and of Ratu Inoke Takiveikata, who was also convicted of coup-related offences, to have their convictions quashed.  Khan claimed that the two had been denied a fair trial according to Section 29 of the Constitution of Fiji, as the trial assessors had been handpicked and therefore possibly biased.

At a court appearance on 17 October 2005, Vakalalabure argued that his conviction was invalid, as the charge is subject to a two-year statute of limitations which had expired by the time of his being charged and that the sentence was wrong as it reflected other offences not attributable to Vakalalabure or to which he was not allowed to respond to.  On this basis, he claimed, he was entitled to a retrial.

The decision on Vakalalabure's final appeal was delayed after judge Shameem (who had convicted Vakalalabure) applied for the Supreme Court to reconstitute its panel of three judges as she believed they would be biased. Vakalabure successfully argued against Shameems application and The Supreme Court refused her application. It was the first time in Fiji that a judge whose decision is appealed against had made such an application. Cost were ordered against her and the State.

On 15 June 2006, Chief Justice Daniel Fatiaki, as president of the Supreme Court, reduced Vakalalabure's prison sentence from six years to four and backdating it by four months, finding that others convicted with him had received lesser sentences.  He was released on 6 July 2006 and served the remaining five months of his sentence on community work with a Christian organisation in Suva.

Expulsion from Parliament 
Following the High Court's decision, President Ratu Josefa Iloilo declared Rakuita's parliamentary seat vacant on 8 June 2005 and issued a writ for a byelection, which was expected to cost F$450,000.  His older brother, Ratu Osea Vakalalabure announced his candidacy, though as a candidate for the Soqosoqo Duavata ni Lewenivanua Party (SDL) of Prime Minister Laisenia Qarase, rather than the CAMV to which Ratu Rakuita belongs, but withdrew on 22 June in favour of the CAMV candidate, Niko Nawaikula, who was declared elected unopposed, thus averting the byelection.

References

1962 births
Living people
Fijian chiefs
I-Taukei Fijian members of the House of Representatives (Fiji)
Bond University alumni
Fijian soldiers
Conservative Alliance-Matanitu Vanua politicians
Politicians from Natewa
Fijian rebels